Tinantia pringlei, sometimes known as the Mexican wandering Jew or Spotted Widow's Tears, is a perennial alpine plant in the dayflower family native to northeastern Mexico. The species is grown as an ornamental plant in temperate areas for its attractive spotted purple foliage and lavender flowers. It is also a common weed of greenhouses. The plants reproduce primarily or exclusively through self-pollination.

References

External links

Commelinaceae
Endemic flora of Mexico
Plants described in 1891
Garden plants